Lori D. Wilson is an American politician elected to the California State Assembly. She is a Democrat elected to represent the 11th district, encompassing Solano County and parts of Contra Costa County, including the cities of Antioch and Oakley. Prior to being elected to the state assembly, she was Mayor of Suisun City.

The last time a Solano resident represented the area was by Tom Hannigan. He represented this area in the California state Assembly from 1978 to 1998.  His daughter, Erin Hannigan Andrews, serves on the Solano County Board of Supervisors.

References

External links 
 
 Campaign website

21st-century American politicians
Living people
Democratic Party members of the California State Assembly
Year of birth missing (living people)